Wendell Edward Jones (November 4, 1937 – October 25, 2011) was an American educator, businessman, and politician.

Born in Battle Creek, Michigan, Jones received his bachelor's degree in speech and hearing therapy and his master's degree in special education from Ball State University. Jones also went to graduated school at Northern Illinois University. He was a speech therapist in the Palatine, Illinois School District. He was also a salesman and was the owner of a promotional products company: "Wenco." Jones served on the Palatine Board of Trustees from 1967 to 1973 and as Palatine Village President from 1973 to 1977. Jones was a Republican. In 1998, he was appointed by local Republican leaders to the Illinois Senate succeed Peter Fitzgerald upon the latter's election to the United States Senate. From 1998 to 2007, Jones served in the Illinois State Senate. Jones did not run for reelection in 2006 and was succeeded by Harper College District 512 trustee and fellow Republican Matt Murphy. Jones died in Fort Myers, Florida.

References

External links

1937 births
2011 deaths
People from Battle Creek, Michigan
People from Palatine, Illinois
Ball State University alumni
Northern Illinois University alumni
Businesspeople from Illinois
Educators from Illinois
Illinois city council members
Mayors of places in Illinois
Republican Party Illinois state senators
Educators from Michigan
20th-century American businesspeople